Lateral release may refer to:
 Lateral release (surgery), a surgical procedure
 Lateral release (phonetics), a type of articulation of a sound